Riva Records was a British record label founded the UK in 1975 by Billy Gaff, manager of Rod Stewart.

Rod Stewart signed to the label in the UK, but stayed with Warner Bros. Records in the US and the rest of the world. Another well-known artist on the label was John Cougar Mellencamp, distributed by PolyGram in the US, and WEA in most other countries. After Stewart and Mellencamp left the label, it stopped operating. Billy died in Dublin 25th April 2022.

Stewart left in 1982 (last issue "How Long"), whereas Mellencamp stayed a little later. A variety of acts then had singles released on Riva in the UK (see below); the last known UK release was RIVA 51 (Glory with "Hearts Will Sing" / "As It Is") in 1987. Other acts to have releases on Riva  included:

 Lewis Sisters / Lewis
 Blinding Tears
 Phil Thornalley
 Carmine Appice
 The Lookalikes, with Sean O'Connor

Discography

(No PS) indicates that the record was issued without a Picture Sleeve

See also
 List of record labels

References

External links

British record labels
Record labels established in 1975
Record labels disestablished in 1987
Pop record labels
Rod Stewart